Moss Bay Exchange F.C. was an English association football club based in the Mossbay area of Workington, Cumberland. The club was elected as a member of the Football Association in May 1891 along with nine other teams. Moss Bay Exchange entered the FA Cup for the first time in the 1895–96 season, and were drawn to play Black Diamonds in their first ever match in the competition. The team progressed to the Second Qualifying Round before being eliminated by Oswaldtwistle Rovers. Moss Bay Exchange reached that stage of the Cup on three more occasions, in 1899–1900, 1901–02 and 1903–04, their final FA Cup appearance.

References

Defunct football clubs in England
Defunct football clubs in Cumbria
Association football clubs disestablished in the 20th century
Works association football teams in England
Association football clubs established in the 19th century
Workington